Nilufar Shomuradova (born 7 July 1999) is an Uzbekistani group rhythmic gymnast who represented Uzbekistan at the 2020 Summer Olympics, in the Women's rhythmic group all-around.

Career
Shomuradova took up rhythmic gymnastics in 2003 for health reasons.

At the 2019 Asian Championships in Thailand, Shomuradova and the Uzbekistani group won two gold medals, as well as a silver in the all-around.

Shomuradova was also part of the Uzbekistani group that won the all-around at the 2021 Asian Championships, taking the gold in both the 5 balls and 4 clubs + 3 hoops finals.

Shomuradova represented her country at the 2018 and 2019 World Championships, where the Uzbekistani group finished seventeenth and fourteenth respectively.

At the 2020 Olympic Games, she competed alongside Kamola Irnazarova, Dinara Ravshanbekova, Sevara Safoeva, and Kseniia Aleksandrova. They finished ninth in the qualification round for the group all-around and were the first reserve for the final.

References

External links

Living people
1999 births
People from Navoiy Region
Uzbekistani rhythmic gymnasts
Gymnasts at the 2020 Summer Olympics
Olympic gymnasts of Uzbekistan